In biology, pseudoculus (plural pseudoculi) is the name applied to various eye-like structures which are nevertheless not eyes. Amongst the organisms possessing pseudoculi are Protura, in which their function is not well-known, and Pauropoda, whose organs are vibration-sensitive.

References

Arthropod anatomy